Raul Proença (May 10, 1884 – May 20, 1941) was a Portuguese writer, journalist, and intellectual. Born in Caldas da Rainha, Proença earned a degree in economic and financial sciences from the Instituto Industrial e Comercial de Lisboa. He was a founder of the magazine Seara Nova. In 1927, Proença was exiled to Paris. Proença returned to Portugal in 1932. He was hospitalized for mental illness, but died of typhoid fever in Porto.

Proença was a supporter of Lamarckian evolution. He argued that Jean-Baptiste Lamarck was the true founder of evolution.

References

External links
 Raul Proença — profile from Centro Virtual Camões
 Ecsola Secundária Raul Proença — secondary school in Caldas da Rainha, Portugal
 

1884 births
1941 deaths
Deaths from typhoid fever
Infectious disease deaths in Portugal
Lamarckism
Portuguese journalists
Male journalists
Portuguese male writers
20th-century journalists
People from Caldas da Rainha